Eric Alfred Knudsen (July 29, 1872  – February 12, 1957) was an American writer, folklorist, lawyer and politician who grew up and lived on Kauai, Hawaii. His father was Valdemar Knudsen, a west Kauai sugar plantation pioneer.

He married Cecilie L'Orange on September 15, 1905, in Oslo, Norway. They had five children.

Knudsen was a delegate from Kauai to the 1904 Republican National Convention. He was also a member of the Hawaii House of Representatives, and served as its Speaker from 1905 to 1907. 

He is most known for his writings and collections of short stories of and about Hawaiian folklore and culture.

Selected works 
 Hawaiian tales told by Teller of Hawaiian Tales (1945)
 Kanuka of Kauai (1945)
 Spooky Stuffs: Hawaiian Ghost Stories (1974)
 Teller of Hawaiian Tales (1946)

Family tree

References

External links
Eric A. Knudsen Trust

1872 births
1957 deaths
Businesspeople from Hawaii
Speakers of the Hawaii House of Representatives
American people of Norwegian descent
Harvard Law School alumni
Members of the Hawaii Territorial Legislature
20th-century American politicians
Writers from Hawaii